C. P. Surendran is an Indian poet, novelist, journalist, columnist and screenplay writer. He writes in English and is based out of New Delhi, India.

Early life and education

Surendran was born on 9 June 1958 in Ottapalam, Kerala. His father, Pavanan (a.k.a. Puthanveettil Narayanan Nair) was a pioneering rationalist, a leftist Malayalam writer and an activist.  His mother, Parvathy Pavanan, is an acclaimed author and a winner of the Kerala Sahitya Academy Award. After schooling in Trivandrum and Chennai, Surendran graduated from a college in Thrissur, and went on to receive his Master's in English Literature from Delhi University, New Delhi.

Career in journalism

Surendran had a brief stint as a teacher of English Literature at Calicut University in Kerala before moving to Mumbai in 1986 to work as a journalist, in the footsteps of his uncle, the late C.P. Ramachandran.

Surendran began his career in print media as a journalist with leading English newspapers including The Times of India, Times Sunday Review and Bombay Times. He was a resident editor of The Times of India in Pune for three years from 2003 to 2006. He was the editor of Open Magazine in New Delhi from 2009 to 2012. He went on to serve as the senior editor with The Times of India in Delhi and later, as chief editor of Daily News and Analysis  (a.k.a. DNA). He is currently a contributing editor, columnist and media consultant with Khaleej Times. He is a columnist for Indian and international papers like The Hindu, The Hindustan Times, Outlook, Khaleej Times, and Gulf News.

In 2018, a range of allegations of sexual harassment were leveled against him, with several women accusing him of making sexually colored remarks and suggestive comments. In the wake of the allegations, Surendran stepped down from his position on the board of directors of the Matrubhumi International Festival of Letters.

Poetry

Surendran's poems have been internationally anthologized, and he has received recognition for writing and journalism including Reuters International Fellowship at Oxford, Wolfson Press Fellowship at Cambridge and British Council Literature Fellowship at Cambridge. A selection of his poems was included in Gemini II (1994). His first independent collection was "Posthumous Poems." His other volumes of poetry include "Canaries on the Moon" (2002), "Portraits of the Space We Occupy" (2007) and "Available Light: New and Collected Poems"(2017)

"Available Light" is a collection of 360 poems written over 25 years and includes new poems appended with those from his previous 4 volumes in poetry.

Stark and often caustic, his poems reflect his preoccupation with love, death and loneliness.

                           Home, I tell the man turning away in the mirror,
                           My captive. Let him go?
                           Cut my wrist and set off a little sunset.
                           Let him go.

Fiction

His books of fiction include "An Iron Harvest" (2006), "Lost and Found" (2010) and "Hadal" (2015). His novel "One Love and the Many Lives of Osip B", was released in July 2021.

Screenplay

Surendran is also a screenplay writer, having written scripts for Gour Hari Dastaan, which was released in 2014 and "Mai Ghat" (2019) which was screened online at the 73rd Festival de Cannes.

Bibliography 

Novels
 An Iron Harvest (Indiaink)
  Lost And Found ( HarperCollins, 2010)
  Hadal  (HarperCollins 2015)
  One Love and the Many Lives of Osip B (Niyogi Books)

Poetry
 Gemini II  (Penguin Viking)
 Posthumous Poems (Penguin Viking)
 Canaries On The Moon (Yeti Press)
 Portraits Of The Space We Occupy (HarperCollins)
 Available Light: New and Collected Poems (HarperCollins)

Screenplay
 Gour Hari Dastaan  (2014)
 Mai Ghat  (2019)

References

External links 

 His poetry review got featured in encyclopedia.com by Bruce King
 Review of An Iron Harvest from Biblio by Vinod Jose
 https://www.imdb.com/title/tt10277744/
 https://www.imdb.com/title/tt4513812/
https://www.hindustantimes.com/books/surendran-s-book-a-comical-critique-of-society/story-KCiHLE8863hPw4n5js5POO.html
https://www.thecommononline.org/september-2018-poetry-feature-cp-surendran/

Academic staff of the University of Calicut
Poets from Kerala
Indian male novelists
English-language poets from India
Living people
1958 births
Indian male poets